Inter-Provincial First Class Tournament (usually referred to as simply the Inter-Provincial Cricket Tournament) was a domestic first-class cricket competition in Sri Lanka, held by Sri Lanka Cricket. It was a part of their Inter-Provincial Cricket program. From 2008 the Inter-Provincial First Class Tournament became the mainstream domestic first class competition in Sri Lanka, with the Premier Trophy being the other, which is played between the clubs in Sri Lanka. The tournament had begun in 1990 as Singer President's Trophy and was played continually for five years, until it was rebooted in 2003. Both Basnahira North and Western Province City, which is now merged into Basnahira North and South, have won the most tournaments, three each.
The tournament is no more contested since 2010.

History

Singer President's Trophy

Inter-Provincial Tournament

Teams

Current teams

Former Teams

Winners

Competition placings

Statistics and records

See also
 Premier Trophy

References

External links
 Cricinfo-provincial archive

Sri Lankan domestic cricket competitions
First-class cricket competitions